Stephen Mertz is an American fiction author who is best known for his mainstream thrillers and novels of suspense.  His work covers a wide variety of styles from paranormal dark suspense (Night Wind and Devil Creek) to historical speculative thrillers (Blood Red Sun) and hardboiled noir (Fade to Tomorrow).

His novels have been well-received critically.  Booklist called Nightwind, “fast-paced...a white-knuckle read.”  Ellery Queen's Mystery Magazine labeled Mertz, “an action specialist.” Edgar-winner Joe R. Lansdale supplies this career assessment: “Stephen Mertz writes a hard-edged, fast-paced thriller for those who like their tales straight and sharp and full of dark surprise,” while Booklist had this to say about The Korean Intercept: "Fans of political thrillers will relish this high-action tale.  An adrenaline rush!” Ed Gorman wrote, “Stephen Mertz just keeps on getting better, each novel more dazzling in story and style.”

Mertz is also a popular lecturer on the craft of writing and has appeared as a guest speaker before writer's groups and at universities.  Early in his career, he was a prolific writer of paperback originals under a variety of pseudonyms. His work on Don Pendleton's Mack Bolan series is regarded by fans as some of the best in that series. He also created the Mark Stone: MIA Hunter  and Cody's Army series, written under the pseudonyms Jack Buchanan and Jim Case respectively.

Stephen Mertz has traveled widely and is a U.S. Army veteran. He presently lives in the American Southwest, and he is always at work on a new book.

Bibliography

Novels
 Some Die Hard (1979, as Stephen Brett)
 The Vampire Chase (1979, as Stephen Brett)
 Blood Red Sun (1989)
 Tunnel Rats (1989, as Cliff Banks)
 Tunnel Rats: Mud and Blood (1990, as Cliff Banks)
 Sudden Death (1995)
 Night Wind (2002)
 Fade to Tomorrow (2004)
 Devil Creek (2004)
 The Korean Intercept (2005)
 Dragon Games (Five Star Books, 2010)
 Hank & Muddy (Perfect Crime Books, 2011)
 The Castro Directive (Crossroad Press, 2013)
 Blaze! (Rough Edges Press, 2015)

The Executioner Series (as Don Pendleton)
 The Iranian Hit #42 (1982)
 Return to Vietnam #43 (1982)
 The Libya Connection #48 (1982)
 Tuscany Terror #52 (1983)
 Day of Mourning #62 (1984)
 Dead Man Running #64 (1984)
 Beirut Payback #67 (1984)
 Appointment in Kabul #73 (1985)
 Teheran Wipeout #76 (1985)
 Dirty War (SuperBolan #4) (1985)
 Moscow Massacre #92 (1986)
 Save the Children #94 (1986)

Cody's Army Series (as Jim Case)
 Cody's Army (1986)
 Assault into Libya (1986)
 Philippine Hardpunch (1987)
 Belfast Blitz (1987)
 D.C. Firestike (1987)
 Hellfire in Haiti (1988)
 Sword of the Prophet (1988)

References

Living people
20th-century American novelists
21st-century American novelists
American male novelists
1947 births
20th-century American male writers
21st-century American male writers